Uba or UBA (and diacritic variations) may refer to:

Place names
 Ubá, small tropical city in the state of Minas Gerais, Brazil
 Uba, Nigeria, part of Askira/Uba Local Government Area in Borno State
 Uba River, in Kazakhstan

Abbreviations
 Royal Union of Belgian Radio Amateurs
 Union of Burma Airways, former name of Myanmar National Airlines
 Umweltbundesamt, the German Environment Agency
 Union Byblos Amchit, a former name of Byblos Club, a multi sports club based in Byblos, Lebanon
 United Baloch Army, a Baloch nationalist militant group designated as a terrorist organisation by the Pakistani government
 United Bank for Africa, an International bank with headquarters in Lagos, Nigeria
 United Basketball Alliance of India
 UBA Pro Basketball League
 Universal Basketball Association, a semi-professional US men's basketball league
 Universidad de Buenos Aires, University of Buenos Aires, Argentina
 User Behavior Analytics